The beadlet anemone (Actinia equina) is a common sea anemone found on rocky shores around all coasts of the British Isles. Its range extends to the rest of Western Europe and the Mediterranean Sea, and along the Atlantic coast of Africa as far south as South Africa.

Actinia equina can be found both in exposed and sheltered situations. It is highly adapted to the intertidal zone as it can tolerate both high temperatures and desiccation. The anemone may also be found in regions of variable salinity such as estuaries.

Beadlet anemones can live in solitary or in aggregations. Solitary beadlet anemones are found to be larger-sized than those that form clustered aggregation. Furthermore, larger sea anemones were found submerged in low tide, where they have greater access to food resources and are less subjected to harsh environmental exposures. The size of beadlet anemones may be connected to their physiological adaptation in regards to limited food resources and withstanding environmental conditions. 

Underwater, it displays up to 192 tentacles, arranged in six circles. It has bright blue beads (known as acrorhagi) located just beneath the tentacles, organised as an external ring containing stinging cells located at the top of the column that it uses to fight over territory. The acrorhagi contains the cnidocysts which themselves contain the nematocysts. There is some evidence that the various colour forms may in fact be different species.

Actinia equina is similar in form to the Waratah anemone (Actinia tenebrosa) of Australia and New Zealand. It is also similar in form to the strawberry anemone (Actinia fragacea) but is a uniform colour and is typically rather smaller.

Actinia equina is viviparous, with up to one hundred embryos developing inside the body cavity before being ejected into the open water as juveniles. A particularly famous example was that of "Granny" which was found on Scotland's east coast by John Dalyell in 1828 and produced several hundred offspring until it died in 1887.

References 

Naylor, P, Great British Marine Animals, 2nd edn, Sound Diving Publications, 2003.
Marine Life Information Network (MarLIN)
Encyclopedia of Marine Life of Britain and Ireland

External links
 

Actiniidae
Animals described in 1758
Taxa named by Carl Linnaeus